The 2006–07 St. Louis Blues season, its 40th in the league, saw the team attempting to improve on the 2005–06 season, in which it had finished with the worst record in the National Hockey League (21–46–15, 57 points).

One major offseason transaction saw the Blues sign Doug Weight back to the roster via free agency, after he had left the team at the trade deadline of the 2005–06 season and won the Stanley Cup as a member of the Carolina Hurricanes.

One notable event of the season was the jersey retirement of Brett Hull's number 16 on December 5, 2006. In the ceremony, the Blues announced that a section of nearby Clark Avenue would be renamed Brett Hull Way. In front of a sellout crowd, the Blues then went on to lose a disappointing game 5–1 to the division rival Detroit Red Wings.

The team started the season very poorly, winning only seven of its first 30 games. A dramatic turn-around was made in mid-December, however, and over a 20-game span, the Blues went 13–3–4. By the end of January, St. Louis had pulled its record to near .500 and had climbed into third place in the Central Division standings.

Regular season

Final standings

Schedule and results

Playoffs
The Blues missed the playoffs for the second straight year.

Player statistics

Regular season
Scoring

Goaltending

Transactions
The Blues have been involved in the following transactions during the 2006–07 season:

Trades

Free agents acquired

Free agents lost

Claimed on waivers

Draft picks
St. Louis' picks at the 2006 NHL Entry Draft in Vancouver, British Columbia. The Blues possessed the first overall pick in the draft.

See also
2006–07 NHL season

References

 

St. Louis
St. Louis
St. Louis Blues seasons
St Louis
St Louis